Montrose may refer to:

Places

Scotland
 Montrose, Angus (the original after which all others ultimately named or derived)
 Montrose Academy, the secondary school in Montrose

Australia
Montrose, Queensland (Southern Downs Region), a locality in the Southern Downs Region
Montrose, Queensland (Western Downs Region), a locality in the Western Downs Region
Montrose, Tasmania, a suburb of Hobart
 Montrose, Victoria, a suburb of Melbourne

Canada
 Montrose, British Columbia
 Montrose (Edmonton), neighbourhood in Edmonton, Alberta
 Rural Municipality of Montrose No. 315, Saskatchewan
 Montrose, Nova Scotia

Republic of Ireland
 Montrose, Dublin, an area where the national television station RTÉ broadcasts from; use of the term "Montrose" often metonymically refers to RTÉ and not the area

United States
 Montrose, Alabama
 Montrose, Arkansas
 Montrose, California
 Montrose, Colorado
 Montrose, Georgia
 Montrose, Illinois
 Montrose, Iowa
 Montrose, Kansas
 Montrose (Clarksville, Maryland), on the list of RHPs in MD
 Montrose, Michigan 
 Montrose, Minnesota
 Montrose, Mississippi
 Montrose, Missouri
 Montrose (Holly Springs, Mississippi), a Mississippi Landmark
 Montrose, Nebraska
 Montrose, New Jersey
 Montrose, New York
 Montrose (Hillsborough, North Carolina), on the list of RHPs in NC
 Montrose-Ghent, Ohio
 Montrose, Ohio
 Montrose, Pennsylvania
 Montrose, South Dakota
 Montrose, Houston, a neighborhood in Houston, Texas
 Montrose, Virginia
 Montrose, West Virginia
 Montrose, Wisconsin, a town
 Montrose (community), Wisconsin, an unincorporated community
 Montrose Avenue, a major street on the north side of Chicago
 Montrose County, Colorado
 Montrose Township (disambiguation)

Trinidad and Tobago
Montrose, Trinidad and Tobago, a town in the Trinidad borough of Chaguanas

Music
 Montrose (band), American hard rock/heavy metal band
Montrose (album), their 1973 self-titled debut album
 "Montrose", a traditional song about James Graham, 1st Marquess of Montrose, recorded by (among others) Steeleye Span on the 1978 album Live at Last
 "Montrose", a song by Man Overboard from the 2010 album Real Talk
 "Montrose", a song by Weyes Blood from the 2014 album The Innocents

Military and naval 
 HMS Montrose, ships of the United Kingdom's Royal Navy
 RAF Montrose, a Royal Air Force station in Scotland
 SS Montrose, several civilian vessels
 USS Montrose (APA/LPA-212), a Haskell-class attack transport of the US Navy in World War II, the Korean War and Vietnam War

Other uses
 Montrose (horse), winner of the Kentucky Derby in 1887
 Montrose (McKenney, Virginia), a historic farmhouse on the U.S. National Register of Historic Places
 Montrose (surname)
 Montrose Chemical Corporation of California
 Montrose F.C., Scottish football team
 Château Montrose, French Bordeaux wine producer, archaically named simply Montrose
 Duke of Montrose, Scottish title

See also
 Montrose station (disambiguation)
 James Graham, 1st Marquess of Montrose (1612–1650), Scottish nobleman and soldier
 Monterosa (disambiguation)
 Monte Rosa (disambiguation)
 Rosemont (disambiguation)
 Rosemount (disambiguation)